Northern Ireland was represented at the 2006 Commonwealth Games in Melbourne by a team of 64 athletes.

Medals

Gold

Silver
 Lawn Bowls Men's Triples: Mark McPeak, Jeremy Henry, Neil Booth.
 David Beattie for the men's individual trap in Shooting.

Bronze

Northern Ireland's Commonwealth Games Team 2006

Aquatics

Swimming

Men's

Women's

Athletics

Men's

Combined events

Women's

Track

Field

Badminton

Men's
 Bruce Topping
 Mark Topping
 Alex Sim

Women's
 Lisa Lynas
 Erin Keery

Boxing 
 48 kg: Patrick Barnes
 51 kg: Ryan Lindberg
 54 kg: Shaun McKim
 63.5 kg: Dermot Hamill
 67 kg: Thomas Hamill
 75 kg: Eamon O'Kane
 81 kg: Ciaran Crossan

Cycling

Men
Team Manager: Alastair Irvine

 Mountain bike cross-country
 Lewis Ferguson
 Road & Track events
 David McCann
 Tommy Evans
 Michael Hutchinson
 Stephen Gallagher
 Ryan Connor
 Roger Aiken
 Philip Deignan (did not compete due to injury)

Gymnastics

Men's
Artistic
 Matthew Cosgrave

Women's
Artistic
 Katie Slader
 Rachel Forde
 Kathryn Ward

Rhythmic
 Kara Hare

Lawn bowls

Men's
 Martin McHugh
 Noel Graham
 Jeremy Henry
 Mark McPeake
 Jonathan Ross
 Neil Booth

Women 
 Margaret Johnston
 Barbara Cameron
 Donna McNally

Shooting

Men
 David Calvert
 Martin Miller
 David Beattie
 Mervyn Morrison
 Alan Lewis
 Cliff Ogle
 Hugh Stewart

Women
 Kathryn Crossan

Squash

Men
 Steve Richardson

Women
 Madeline Perry

Table tennis
 Jason Sugrue
 Jonathan Cowan
 Andrew Dennison
 Peter Graham

Triathlon

Men
 Gavin Noble
 Brian Campbell

Women
 Heather Wilson

External links
Sports Council Northern Ireland

Commonwealth Games
Nations at the 2006 Commonwealth Games
Northern Ireland 2006